The International Multilingual Research Journal is a peer-reviewed academic journal in linguistics and education, focusing on the study of multilingualism. The current editorial team consists of Jeff MacSwan as Editor-in-Chief and Associate Editors Jin Sook Lee, Danny C. Martinez, Deborah Palmer, and Kellie Rolstad. The journal was established in 2007 with Terrence G. Wiley and Alfredo Artiles as founding editors.

Abstracting and indexing 
The journal is abstracted and indexed in: Linguistics and Language Behavior Abstracts and ERIC.

External links 
 

Works about multilingualism
Education journals
Language education journals
Linguistics journals
Publications established in 2007
Taylor & Francis academic journals
English-language journals
Triannual journals